Iron(III) stearate (ferric stearate) is a metal-organic compound, a salt of iron and stearic acid with the chemical formula .

The compound is classified as a metallic soap, i.e. a metal derivative of a fatty acid.

Synthesis
Reacting stearic acid with iron oxide.

Treating stearic acid with iron chloride in presence of DABCO.

Physical properties
The compound forms orange-red powder. Hygroscopic.

Insoluble in water. Soluble in hot ethanol, toluene, chloroform, acetone, benzene, turpentine.

Uses
The compound is used as a catalyst in organic synthesis. Also, as a reagent in analytical chemistry, and as a stabilizer in biochemistry.

References

Stearates
Iron compounds